U-69,593 is a drug which acts as a potent and selective κ1-opioid receptor agonist. In animal studies it has been shown to produce antinociception, anti-inflammation, anxiolysis (at low doses), respiratory depression, and diuresis, while having little effect on gastrointestinal motility. It also inhibits the peripheral, though not central secretion of oxytocin and vasopressin in rats.

See also 
 U-50,488
The dichloro analog is called spiradoline.

References 

Acetamides
Opioids
Pyrrolidines
Kappa-opioid receptor agonists
Tetrahydrofurans
Spiro compounds